The Longview metropolitan area may refer to:

The Longview metropolitan area, Texas, United States
The Longview metropolitan area, Washington, United States

See also
Longview (disambiguation)